Jang In-sub (born 24 February, 1987) is a South Korean actor. He is best known for his supporting roles in Special Affairs Team TEN Season 2, Secret Door (TV series) and Mrs. Cop. Lee also appeared in the famous and popular drama of School series, Who Are You: School 2015 as Seong Yoon Jae.

Filmography

Television

Web series

Film

Theater

Awards and nominations

References

External links 
 
 
 

1987 births
Living people
21st-century South Korean male actors
South Korean male models
South Korean male television actors
South Korean male film actors